Global Institute of Technology & Management, Gurgaon) was established in 2008 under the aegis of Baljeet Singh Education Society (Regd.). The institute is approved by All India Council for Technical Education (AICTE), Ministry of HRD, Govt. of India and also by Directorate of Technical Education, Government of Haryana. The institute is affiliated to Maharshi Dayanand University, Rohtak, which is one of the biggest universities in the state of Haryana, accredited ‘A’ Grade by National Assessment & Accreditation Council (NAAC). The institute is located at Gurgaon, which is the home of some leading companies of IT, software & large multinationals in India.

Campus 
It is spread over 18 acres of land with lush green surroundings & with state-of-the-art & environment friendly infrastructure to provide best of the facilities to the students studying in the institute. The institute has 3 Lac sq. ft. of constructed area, 10 computer labs with more than 500 PCs, 20 MBPS lease line with a Wi-Fi campus to provide round the clock connectivity of Internet to the students.

The library at Global Institute has more than 20,000 books and national & international journals and e-journals. The institute has in-house hostel facility for both boys & girls with choice of A/C & non-A/C rooms. With students from all over India and neighbouring countries like Nepal, Bhutan, Bangladesh and even from U.A.E., the institute has rich cultural diversity of students in its campus.

Transport services 
GITM offer the best transport service to the student along with different facilities such free wi-fi, A.C for the student and More than 12 buses are available for student to pickup from the home.

Academic 
Engineering & Technology
 B.Tech.	Mechanical Engineering (ME)	
 B.Tech.	Computer Science Engineering (CSE)	
 B.Tech.	Electronics & Communication Engineering (ECE)	
 B.Tech.	Civil Engineering (CE)
 B.Tech.	Mechanical & Automation Engineering (M & AE)	
 B.Tech.	Information Technology (IT)
 B.Tech.	Automobile Engineering (AE)

M.TECH. Programme
 M.Tech.	Computer Science & Engineering (CSE)	
 M.Tech.	Electronics & Communication Engineering (ECE)

Management Programme
 BBA	Bachelor of Business Administration	
 MBA	Master of Business Administration

References 

https://www.admissionfever.com/Admission/College/Global-Institute-of-Technology-and-Management/2446

External links

Engineering colleges in Haryana
Business schools in Haryana
Universities and colleges in Gurgaon
Educational institutions established in 2008
2008 establishments in Haryana